Alexandre Pires is the eponymous debut studio album recorded by Brazilian singer-songwriter Alexandre Pires. It was released by BMG U.S. Latin on July 3, 2001 (see 2001 in music). The Brazilian edition was called É Por Por Amor.

The album was supported by three singles: "Usted Se Me Llevó La Vida", "Necesidad" and "Es Por Amor"

Track listing

Charts

Certifications

References

2001 debut albums
Alexandre Pires albums
RCA Records albums
Spanish-language albums
Portuguese-language albums
Albums produced by Estéfano